The freshwater drum, Aplodinotus grunniens, is a fish endemic to North and Central America. It is the only species in the genus Aplodinotus, and is a member of the family Sciaenidae. It is the only North American member of the group that inhabits freshwater for its entire life. Its generic name, Aplodinotus, comes from Greek meaning "single back", and the specific epithet, grunniens, comes from a Latin word meaning "grunting". It is given to it because of the grunting noise that mature males make. This noise comes from a special set of muscles within the body cavity that vibrate against the swim bladder. The purpose of the grunting is unknown, but due to it being present in only mature males and during the spawning season, it is assumed to be linked to spawning.

The drum typically weighs  . The freshwater drum is gray or silvery in turbid waters and more bronze or brown colored in clearer waters. It is a deep bodied fish with a divided dorsal fin consisting of 10 spines and 29–32 rays.

The freshwater drum is also called Russell fish, shepherd's pie, gray bass, Gasper goo, Gaspergou, gou, grunt, grunter, grinder,  gobble, and croaker. It is commonly known as sheephead and sunfish in parts of Canada, the United Kingdom, and the United States.

Geographic distribution
Freshwater drum are the only North American member of their family to exclusively inhabit freshwater (freshwater family members in genera Pachypops, Pachyurus, Petilipinnis and Plagioscion are from South America, while Boesemania is Asian). Their great distribution range goes as far north as the Hudson Bay, and reaches as far south as Guatemala. Their longitudinal distribution goes as far east as the eastern Appalachians and stretches as far west into Texas, Kansas, and Oklahoma. Freshwater drum are considered to be one of the most wide-ranging species in North America.

Ecology
The freshwater drum prefers clear water, but it is tolerant of turbid and murky water. They prefer the bottom to be clean sand and gravel substrates.

The diet of the freshwater drum is generally benthic and composed of macroinvertebrates (mainly aquatic insect larvae and bivalve mussels), as well as small fish in certain ecosystems.  Freshwater drum show distinct seasonal differences in their diet. In April and May, the drum feeds on dipterans. During these months, dipterans make up about 50 percent of the freshwater drum's diet.  In August through November, they tend to eat fish (which are primarily young-of-the-year gizzard shad). The percentage of fish in their diet at this time ranges from 52 to 94 percent. Other items in the drum's diet are mollusks and crayfish.

The freshwater drum competes with several organisms. During its early stages in Lake Erie, it has been shown to compete with yellow perch, the trout-perch, and the emerald shiner. During its adult lifetime, it competes with yellow perch and silver chub in deep water, and competes with black bass in the shoal areas.

Predators on drum include humans and other fish. During its first year, the freshwater drum serves as a forage fish for many species of predatory fish. These include smallmouth bass, walleye, and many other piscivores. After its first year, the primary predators on freshwater drum are humans. The drum is an important commercial crop on the Mississippi River, but in other areas it constitutes only a small portion of the commercial catch. Consistent with other sciaenids, freshwater drum are strongly nocturnal with the bulk of most catches being derived from night angling/sampling.  Commercial fisheries are present for this species, although market price tends to be quite low.  Thus, many freshwater drum are harvested as bycatch from targeted higher-value species.

There has been some research on the freshwater drum's impact on the invasive zebra mussel in northern lakes and rivers. The fish larger than  exhibit less selectivity and consume mussels relative to their availability in lakes. These larger fish are not restricted by their ability to crush zebra mussels, but they are restricted by the size of the clumps that they can remove. The drums' eating of zebra mussels contributes to a high mussel mortality, but not enough to have an impact on their spread, or control the population.

Life history

During the spawn, females release their eggs into the water column and males release their sperm. Fertilization is random. Males generally reach sexual maturity at four years, whereas females reach maturity at five or six years. Females from six to nine years old have a clutch size of 34,000 to 66,500 eggs and they spawn in open water giving no parental care to their larvae. The eggs then float to the top of the water column and hatch between two and four days.

Freshwater drums are long-lived and have attained maximum ages of 72 years old in Red Lakes, Minnesota and 32 years old in the Cahaba River, Alabama. Though they can reach very old age, the average age of a freshwater drum is between 6 and 13 years. In some cases, otoliths provide such a long record of growth that they can be studied using the same techniques as those used by dendochronologists.

Current management
There are few management practices for the species, and in many regions daily bag limits are unlimited. The freshwater drum is not federally or state listed by any states. Although the commercial harvest is up to 1 million pounds per year, they are in no danger of overharvest. Due to its abundance, many states allow bowfishing and other non-conventional means to harvest the fish.

See also
 Lucky stone

References

Sciaenidae
Fish of the Great Lakes
Monotypic fish genera
Fish described in 1819
Freshwater fish of North America
Taxa named by Constantine Samuel Rafinesque